James Woodrow may refer to:

 James Woodrow (professor) (1828–1907), professor at Columbia Theological Seminary, and president of the College of South Carolina
 James Woodrow (musician) (born 1961), English guitarist